Åke Ekman (14 November 1912 – 17 September 1965) was a Finnish speed skater. He competed in two events at the 1936 Winter Olympics.

References

1912 births
1965 deaths
Finnish male speed skaters
Olympic speed skaters of Finland
Speed skaters at the 1936 Winter Olympics
Sportspeople from Helsinki